Ishoyahb V Baladi was Patriarch of the Church of the East from 1149 to 1175.

Sources 

Ishoyahb's patriarchate 
The following account of Ishoyahb's patriarchate is given by Bar Hebraeus:

Then Ishoyahb, an old and chaste man from Balad, who had formerly been bishop of Hirta, was made catholicus, for he was chosen by a certain famous doctor named Abu Mansur, son of a wise scribe.  He was consecrated on the second Sunday of the Dedication of the Church, in the year 542 [AD 1147], and after he had fulfilled his office for twenty-eight years, he died on the night of the second Sunday after Ascension, on the twenty-fifth day of iyyar [May], in the year 570 of the Arabs [AD 1174]. He was succeeded by Eliya III, known as Abu Halim.

See also
 List of patriarchs of the Church of the East

Notes

References
 Abbeloos, J. B., and Lamy, T. J., Bar Hebraeus, Chronicon Ecclesiasticum (3 vols, Paris, 1877)
 Assemani, J. A., De Catholicis seu Patriarchis Chaldaeorum et Nestorianorum (Rome, 1775)
 Brooks, E. W., Eliae Metropolitae Nisibeni Opus Chronologicum (Rome, 1910)
 Gismondi, H., Maris, Amri, et Salibae: De Patriarchis Nestorianorum Commentaria I: Amri et Salibae Textus (Rome, 1896)
 Gismondi, H., Maris, Amri, et Salibae: De Patriarchis Nestorianorum Commentaria II: Maris textus arabicus et versio Latina (Rome, 1899)

External links 

Patriarchs of the Church of the East
12th-century bishops of the Church of the East
Nestorians in the Abbasid Caliphate
1175 deaths